Manuel da Silva Passos (5 January 1801 – 16 January 1862) was a Portuguese jurist and politician, one of the most notable personalities of 19th-century Portuguese Liberalism. He is more commonly referred to as Passos Manuel, due to the way he was addressed in Parliament, where members were announced by their surname — "Manuel" being apposed to his surname in order to distinguish him from his brother, José da Silva Passos (Passos José), who was also a member of Parliament.

Also notably, he entrusted Almeida Garrett with drawing up a plan to promote national theatre, which resulted in the creation of Queen Maria II National Theatre and the National Conservatory of Dramatic Art. He also introduced the 1836 Administrative Code, the first of its kind in Portugal.

A declaration of principles written by Passos Manuel became famous: "I am a Minister of the Queen — the Queen is the head of the whole nation. And before I was for the Left, I was for the Fatherland. The Fatherland is my policy."

He married Gervásia Joaquina Farinha de Sousa Falcão on 28 December 1838, and they had two daughters: Beatriz de Passos Manuel, who was granted the title of Viscountess of Passos by King Peter V in 1861 as a reward for her father's services; and Antónia de Passos Manuel, who married Pedro de Sousa Canavarro, grandson of the 1st Baron of Arcossô.

See also
Belenzada
Rossio massacre

References 

1801 births
1862 deaths
19th-century Portuguese people
Finance ministers of Portugal
Government ministers of Portugal
People from Matosinhos